The Matter Master is a DC Comics supervillain and a recurring foe of Hawkman. Created by Gardner Fox and Joe Kubert, he first appeared in The Brave and the Bold #35 (April–May 1961).

Fictional character history
Scientist turned alchemist Mark Mandrill is trying to turn lead into gold when the compound he is working on explodes. Instinctively shouting "Stay away from me!", he is amazed when the compound obeys his commands. Dubbing the material "Mentachem", he makes a wand out of it and uses it to begin a life of crime. He fights against Hawkman for many years, as well as the Justice League of America. He is also a member of the Secret Society of Super Villains.

Matter Master later resurfaces in St. Roch, kidnapping rich people to draw Hawkman into a confrontation. The battle lasts only a few seconds, ending when Hawkman severs Matter Master's right arm with his axe. Mandrill later returns in league with a team of other villains who had been victims of mind-wipes by the JLA.

Powers and abilities
Matter Master has no innate superpowers, but using his "Mentachem" wand can reshape, transmute, or levitate any matter. The effect vanishes over time or as soon as he loses contact with the wand. He also has a genius level intellect.

Other versions
A heroic Earth-Three version of Mandrill exists as Matter Mage and a member of the Justice Society All Stars.

In other media

Miscellaneous
 Matter Master appears in Justice League Unlimited #31. His powers allow him to control an overconfident Metamorpho due to his elemental nature.
 In the first story arc of the 2011 Batman Beyond ongoing series, a metahuman control officer named Carson Jatts discovers that the many metahuman energies he has been exposed over the years has given him a form of cancer that started to kill him. Wanting revenge against the superhero community, Jatts tries to steal the metachem wand, but accidentally absorbs its energies into his hand, giving him the power to change elements by touch but only accelerate his condition. After suffering an injury following an altercation with the Justice League Unlimited, Jatts turns his powers upon himself, restoring his body and dubbing himself the new Matter Master.
 Matter Master had a cameo in The All-New Batman: The Brave and the Bold issue #9.

References

External links
Matter Master at the Unofficial Guide to the DC Universe

DC Comics supervillains
Fictional alchemists
DC Comics metahumans
Characters created by Joe Kubert
Characters created by Gardner Fox
Comics characters introduced in 1961